This article is a discography for the work of former Temptations singer David Ruffin as a solo artist and in other group acts outside of The Temptations. It also includes a listing of his lead vocal recordings with The Temptations.

Solo discography

Albums

Compilations

Singles

Group singles outside of The Temptations

The Voice Masters

The Ruffin Brothers (David & Jimmy Ruffin)

Daryl Hall & John Oates with David Ruffin & Eddie Kendrick

Ruffin & Kendrick

Complete lead vocals with the Temptations
The Temptations Sing Smokey (1965)
"My Girl" (Robinson, Ronald White)
"You'll Lose a Precious Love" (Robinson) – Recorded on March 2, 1964, it's the first lead Ruffin recorded with the group.
"It's Growing" (Robinson, Warren Moore)
"Who's Lovin' You" (Robinson)
"You've Really Got a Hold on Me" (Robinson) – Ruffin and Paul Williams sings "the unison harmony co-lead vocal" with Eddie Kendrick
The Temptin' Temptations (1965)
"Since I Lost My Baby" (Robinson, Moore)
"My Baby" (Robinson, Moore, Robert Rogers)
"Born to Love You" (Ivy Jo Hunter, William "Mickey" Stevenson) – shared with Eddie Kendrick
"You're the One I Need" (Robinson) – Ruffin sings the bridge with Paul Williams while Kendrick leads the rest of the song
Gettin' Ready (1966)
"Say You" (Charles Jones, Robert Dobyne, Robert Staunton)
"Little Miss Sweetness" (Robinson)
"Ain't Too Proud to Beg" (Edward Holland, Jr., Norman Whitfield)
Greatest Hits (1966)
"Beauty Is Only Skin Deep" (recorded in 1966, E. Holland, Whitfield)
Temptations Live! (1966)
"I Want a Love I Can See" (Robinson) – shared with Paul Williams (who was the only lead on the studio version) and Eddie Kendrick for this live performance
"Yesterday"/"What Now My Love" (John Lennon, Paul McCartney, Gilbert Bécaud, Pierre Delanoë, Carl Sigman) – Ruffin does a soulful rendition of McCartney's "Yesterday".  He also sings Bécaud's "What Now My Love" with Melvin Franklin doing speaking parts in French.
The Temptations with a Lot o' Soul (1967)
"(I Know) I'm Losing You" (Cornelius Grant, E. Holland, Whitfield)
"Ain't No Sun Since You've Been Gone" (Grant, Sylvia Moy, Whitfield)
"All I Need" (Frank Wilson, E. Holland, R. Dean Taylor)
"(Loneliness Made Me Realize) It's You That I Need" (E. Holland, Whitfield)
"Just One Last Look" (Holland-Dozier-Holland)
"Sorry is a Sorry Word" (E. Holland, Hunter)
"You're My Everything" (Roger Penzabene, Grant, Whitfield) – shared with Eddie Kendrick
"Now That You've Won Me" (Robinson)
The Temptations in a Mellow Mood (1967)
"Hello, Young Lovers" (Richard Rodgers, Oscar Hammerstein II) – vocal ensemble; Ruffin has brief solos
"Somewhere" (Leonard Bernstein, Stephen Sondheim)
"I'm Ready for Love" (Holland-Dozier-Holland)
"What Now My Love" (Bécaud, Delanoë, Sigman)
"The Impossible Dream" (Joe Darion, Mitch Leigh)
The Temptations Wish It Would Rain (1968)
"I Could Never Love Another (After Loving You)" (Penzabene, Barrett Strong, Whitfield)
"Cindy" (Robinson)
"I Wish It Would Rain" (Penzabene, Strong, Whitfield)
"Fan the Flame" (Al Cleveland, Terry "Buzzy" Johnson, Robinson)
"He Who Picks a Rose" (E. Holland, Emilio "Father" Smiley, Whitfield)
"Why Did You Leave Me Darling" (James Dean, Deke Richards)
"I've Passed This Way Before" (Dean, William Weatherspoon)
Later releases (found on the Emperors of Soul box set released in 1994 and the Lost and Found: You've Got to Earn It (1962–1968) LP released in 1999)
"I Got Heaven Right Here on Earth" (recorded in 1966, Eddie Kendrick, E. Holland)
"Angel Doll" (recorded in 1967) (Morris Broadnax, Clarence Paul, Stevie Wonder)
"What Am I Gonna Do Without You" (recorded in 1966, Hunter, Wonder)
"Love Is What You Make It" (Robinson)
"I Know She's Not a Mannequin" (John Bristol, Shena Dermell, Harvey Fuqua)
"Only a Lonely Man Would Know" (Hunter, Beatrice Verdi)
"That'll Be the Day" (recorded in 1965, Henry Cosby, Moy, Stevenson)
"We'll Be Satisfied" (recorded in 1967, Marc Gordon, F. Wilson) – shared with Eddie Kendrick and Paul Wiliams

Notes

References

Further reading
Ribowsky, Mark (2010). Ain't Too Proud to Beg: The Troubled Lives and Enduring Soul of the Temptations. Hoboken, New Jersey: John Wiley & Sons. .
Asanovic, Bosko; Rimmer, Dave; Thomas, Colton; and Robbins, Steve (2011). "David Ruffin". Soulful Kinda Music.

Rhythm and blues discographies
Discographies of American artists
Soul music discographies